Bund Center is a , 50-storey tower in the Huangpu area of Shanghai, China. Designed by the architects of John Portman and Associates, the tower was completed in 2002.

The building is mainly used for offices and major tenants of the building are Deloitte Touche Tohmatsu, Nokia, APP and Regus. The Bund Center’s prominent outer appearance is the crown located on top of the building. A total of 16 indicator lights are installed so that the crown illuminates a golden light at nighttime. The investors of the building are Shanghai Golden Bund Real Estate CO., LTD. Asia Food and Properties LTD. and Shanghai Huangpu Investment (Group) Development CO., LTD.

The Westin Bund Center hotel is attached to the Bund Center, offering dining and entertainment experience to visitors.

References

External links
 Official site
 The Westin Bund Center as 3D-Modell in 3D Warehouse of Google SketchUp

Sinar Mas Group
2002 establishments in China
Buildings and structures completed in 2002
John C. Portman Jr. buildings
Skyscraper office buildings in Shanghai
Skyscraper hotels in Shanghai